Salix acmophylla, also known as brook willow, is a willow native to central Asia, the Middle East and Egypt.

References

acmophylla
Taxa named by Pierre Edmond Boissier